Georgios Poikilidis (born 31 October 1961) is a Greek wrestler. He competed at the 1980 Summer Olympics, the 1984 Summer Olympics and the 1988 Summer Olympics. His brother was Panagiotis.

References

External links
 

1961 births
Living people
Greek male sport wrestlers
Olympic wrestlers of Greece
Wrestlers at the 1980 Summer Olympics
Wrestlers at the 1984 Summer Olympics
Wrestlers at the 1988 Summer Olympics
Place of birth missing (living people)
20th-century Greek people